Back to Now is the seventh and latest studio album by American female vocal group Labelle, released on October 21, 2008. The album is the group's first in over thirty years though they had sung on songs together on occasion.

Labelle member Nona Hendryx explained the album's title to noted R&B writer Pete Lewis of Blues & Soul: "It basically stemmed from two of the songs on this album being songs I'd specifically written for what would have been the next Labelle album back in 1977. So the title 'Back To Now" is really signifying that this record represents us really getting back to where we were. It's basically a continuation from where we stopped off."

The first single is "Roll Out", which features and is produced by Wyclef Jean which had the three Labelle members Patti LaBelle, Nona Hendryx and Sarah Dash singing in autotune.

The album is also notable for the modest R&B charted ballad, "Superlover". Except for "The Truth Will Set You Free", originally recorded by Mother's Finest, in which Hendryx sings the lead over Lenny Kravitz's guitar and LaBelle's ad-libs in soprano and "System", which LaBelle, Hendryx and Dash each take a prominent lead vocal, the album is led as always by LaBelle, who gives a powerful vocal in the socially conscious "Tears for the World", a Hendryx composition.

The album is also notable for their tribute to civil rights activist Rosa Parks with "Dear Rosa" and also includes their 1971 rendition of the Cole Porter standard, "Miss Otis Regrets", which was originally recorded for sessions of their Warner debut, Labelle, but was cut from the album's final selection of tracks.

An iTunes edition of the album features the group's cover of Sylvester's disco hit, "You Make Me Feel (Mighty Real)".

Track listing 
 "Candlelight" (Nona Hendryx) 4:41
 "Roll Out" (featuring Wyclef Jean) (Hendryx, Wyclef Jean, Jerry Duplessis, Patti LaBelle, Sarah Dash) 3:51
 "Superlover" (Hendryx, LaBelle, Dash) 4:14
 "System" (Hendryx) 5:32
 "The Truth Will Set You Free" (Barry Borden, Michael Keck, Gary Moore, Joyce Kennedy, Jerry Seay, Glenn Murdock) 4:58
 "Without You in My Life" (Hendryx, Dash, LaBelle, Kenneth Gamble) 5:29
 "Tears for the World" (Gamble, LaBelle, Leon A. Huff) 4:33
 "Dear Rosa" (Hendryx, Roni Morgan, Michael Waters) 6:47
 "How Long" (Hendryx, LaBelle, Dash) 4:33
 "Miss Otis Regrets" (Cole Porter) 4:39
 "You Make Me Feel (Mighty Real)" (James Wirrick, Sylvester) (4:31) (iTunes Bonus Track)

Charts 
Back to Now debuted at number 45 on Billboard'''s album chart in the issue dated November 8, 2008. It also charted on R&B/Hip-Hop Albums, debuting at number 9. Back to Now'' is Labelle's seventh overall, and third highest-ranked album to chart in the United States.

References

External links 
 Back to Now on Verve Records
 Labelle Official

2008 albums
Labelle albums
Albums produced by Kenneth Gamble
Albums produced by Leon Huff